Ley lines are a pseudoscientific belief that apparent alignments of landmarks are not accidental and have spiritual significance.

Ley Lines may also refer to:

 Ley Lines (film), a 1999 Japanese film directed by Takashi Miike
 Ley Lines (album), a 2008 album by Embrace the End
 ley lines (Flor album), a 2019 album by Flor
 Leylines, a 2019 album by Rising Appalachia

See also
 Ley's Line, a 2002 Japanese movie directed by Fukutani Osamu